Mbala (Gimbala, Rumbala) is a Bantu language of the Congo. It is widely spoken in the area around the town of Kitwit.

References

Pende languages
Languages of the Democratic Republic of the Congo